USS Montgomery, a sloop or schooner, was built in 1813 by Thomas MacDonough and purchased on 6 August 1813 for duty on Lake Champlain, preventing plundering expeditions and convoying Wade Hampton's troops trying to penetrate into Canada. Montgomery continued service on the lake until deactivated and sold in 1815.

She was named for Brigadier General Richard Montgomery who fought and died in the American Revolutionary War.

References 
 

War of 1812 ships of the United States
1813 ships